Elison Fagundes dos Santos (born August 21, 1987 in Itabuna), or simply Itacaré, is a Brazilian football striker.

Club career
In 2016, dos Santos signed with UES of the Salvadoran Primera División, but had few opportunities to play with the scarlet team and left the club months later in the middle of an administrative and economic crisis.

References

External links

 consadole-sapporo.jp
 CBF

1987 births
Living people
Sportspeople from Bahia
Brazilian footballers
Esporte Clube Vitória players
Brazilian expatriate footballers
Expatriate footballers in Japan
Expatriate footballers in Bahrain
J2 League players
Hokkaido Consadole Sapporo players
Tupi Football Club players
Expatriate footballers in Bolivia
Oriente Petrolero players
Americano Futebol Clube players
Esporte Clube Bahia players
Brazilian expatriate sportspeople in Bolivia
Association football midfielders
Al Hala SC players